Preaek Prasab is a district located in Kratié province, in Cambodia. Chambok is a commune in Preaek Prasab district. There is a mountain, Soporkaley, nearby with views of the Mekong River. There is a high school near the mountain.

Communes and villages

Districts of Kratié province